Eritherium is an extinct genus of early Proboscidea found in the Ouled Abdoun basin (early Thanetian age), Morocco. It lived about 60 million years ago. It was first named by Emmanuel Gheerbrant in 2009 and the type species is Eritherium azzouzorum. Eritherium is the oldest, smallest and most primitive known elephant relative.

Description
The holotype (specimen number MNHN PM69) is now in the Musée d'histoire naturelle - Guimet in Lyon and includes an upper jaw (with approaches of the zygomatic bone and two maxillary branches, each of the two posterior premolars (P3 and 4) and three molars (M1-3)). The piece is about 6 inches long, 5 inches wide and just over 3 inches high. In addition, the fossils include 15 more objects including the skull bones (frontal and nasal bones), lower jaw fragments and teeth and the upper and lower jaw. It was about 20 cm tall at the shoulder and weighed about 5–6 kg.

Generally, Eritherium shared similarities in the structure of their teeth with other Paenungulata such as the extinct Embrithopoda or early representatives of the manatees, but their teeth are more specialised. The dentition of the mandible that was reconstructed (from two left fragments) made up the complete sequence of the original teeth of mammals: with three incisors, one canine, four premolars and three molars. The tooth row was closed and had no diastema between the canine tooth on the front and back teeth. This primitive mammalian dentition is unique among Proboscideans.

The molars were generally bunodont (i.e. with small enamel cusps on the occlusal surface-bearing structure). Between these bumps were approaches for forming transverse strips on the first two molars and on the rearmost molar, which is typical in lophodont teeth. The premolars had only one (lower jaw) or two (in the maxilla) cusps. The first incisor is relatively large and asymmetric and already showed signs of reduction. These facts link Eritherium with other early Proboscideans. Another primitive characteristic is the short symphysis of the mandible.

The reconstruction of the upper portion of the skull showed that the eye socket was relatively far forward in the skull. Most other early Paenungulata had an orbit significantly shifted to the rear position of the skull.

Systematics
Eritherium is the oldest known representative of the Proboscidea, although it remains unassigned to any family within this order. Fitting with its great age, Eritherium is basal to all other primitive proboscideans (including Phosphatherium, Numidotherium, Moeritherium and Daouitherium) which together form one of the most complete evolutionary sequences of early mammalian radiations following the K/T extinction event.  Cladistic analyses suggest that the closest relatives of the proboscid lineage are the manatees (Sirenia) and Desmostylia. Together with Embrithopoda and the hyraxes (Hyracoidea) they form the group Paenungulata. The great age and location of Eritherium support the hypothesis that paenungulates originated in Africa and diversified rapidly in the Paleocene.

History of discovery
The findings of Eritherium come from Sidi Chennane, quarry in Ouled Abdoun phosphate basin in Morocco. These are 10 to 20 km south of Grand Daoui, where in 1996 (Phosphatherium) and 2002 (Daouitherium) two early proboscideans were described. The Eritherium fossils were found in the "lower bone bed" of the phosphate layer. Other fossils from this layer include earliest evidence of the carnivorous Hyaenodontidae, and a diverse assortment of elasmobranchs (sharks and rays). This places the findings in a geological time ranging from 61.1 to 57.8 million years ago. The genus was named by Emmanuel Gheerbrant (2009). The name Eritherium comes from the Greek words "eρυ" (eri: old) and "θηρίον" (therion: animal), while the species name azzouzorum honors the residents of the village of Ouled Azzouz, near where most of the fossils were discovered.

References

Fossil taxa described in 2009
Paleocene proboscideans
Transitional fossils
Prehistoric monotypic mammal genera
Paleocene mammals of Africa
Prehistoric placental genera